Saldaga (also known as As We Live or While You Live) is the second Korean studio album by SG Wannabe. It included the two #1 hits "Sin and Punishment", which received numerous awards both for the music video and for the song itself, and "Saldaga". Like its predecessor, "Saldaga" was able to attract media attention for the group's vocal ability, thus SG Wannabe became the only artist in 2005 to sell more than 400,000 copies of their album. The album had sold 485,926 copies.

A special edition of the album was released on 13 June 2005, attracting rare praise from current UN Secretary General Ban Ki-Moon.

SG Wannabe was awarded the prestigious Daesang (the "Artist Of The Year") from the Golden Disk Awards in 2005.

Music videos
A two-part drama music video was released for "Sin and Punishment" and "Saldaga". The music videos starred Ha Seok-jin, Seo Jun-young, and Han Eun-jung.

Notable tracks

"Sin and Punishment"
"Sin and Punishment" was SG Wannabe's title track for this album. It is a mid-tempo song. "Sin and Punishment" was one of the most popular songs of 2005.

"Saldaga"
"Saldaga" (also known as "As We Live" or "While You Live") was the follow-up track.

"Craze"
"Craze" was an upbeat tracked that was loved by many fans, and a remix version was released as a music video which featured Han Eun-jung and Hwang Jung-eum.

Track listing

Special Edition

CD 1

CD 2

SG Wannabe albums
Stone Music Entertainment albums
2005 albums
Grand Prize Golden Disc Award-winning albums